Stephen Sebo (July 15, 1914 – December 10, 1989) was an American football and baseball player, coach, college athletics administrator, and professional sports executive.  He played baseball and football at Michigan State University, from which he graduated in 1937. He then played minor league baseball and coached sports at Petoskey High School in Petoskey, Michigan. During the World War II era, he served in the United States Army Air Forces and was discharged after 5 years with the rank of major. After the war, Sebo was the head football coach at Alma College from 1946 to 1948 and at the University of Pennsylvania from 1954 to 1959, compiling a career college football record of 33–42–2.

The highlight of Sebo's tenure at Penn was the 1959 season, in which the Quakers won their first Ivy League championship. As it turned out, even that wasn't enough to save his job; school officials had already decided before the season that his contract would not be renewed.

He also coached basketball at Alma from 1946 to 1949, tallying a mark of 36–24.  After Sebo was fired from his post at Penn following the 1959 season, he became the general manager of the New York Titans, a newly formed team of the upstart American Football League that was renamed as the New York Jets in 1963.  Sebo left the Titans in 1962 to become the athletic director at the University of Virginia.

Head coaching record

College football

References

1914 births
1989 deaths
American football halfbacks
Baseball catchers
Alma Scots athletic directors
Alma Scots football coaches
Alma Scots men's basketball coaches
Harvard Crimson football coaches
Michigan State Spartans baseball players
Michigan State Spartans football coaches
Michigan State Spartans football players
New York Jets executives
Penn Quakers football coaches
Virginia Cavaliers athletic directors
High school baseball coaches in the United States
High school basketball coaches in Michigan
High school football coaches in Michigan
Minor league baseball players
United States Army Air Forces officers
Sportspeople from Battle Creek, Michigan
Players of American football from Michigan
Baseball players from Michigan
Military personnel from Michigan